Stanimir Stoilov (born 13 February 1967) is a former Bulgarian footballer and current head coach of Levski Sofia. He was the manager of Litex Lovech, the Bulgarian national team, FC Astana and the national team of Kazakhstan.

Career

Player
Stoilov began his career at the local club FC Haskovo, where he stayed until 1990. His first spell at Levski Sofia spanned for 2 years, between July 1990 and June 1992, when he moved to the Turkish club Fenerbahçe and then played shortly for Levski rival CSKA Sofia only to return to Levski Sofia for another year between July 1994 and June 1995. He then spent some time playing in Portugal and then for PFC Slavia Sofia before returning again to Levski Sofia for a third spell since July 1998 as a captain and assistant manager since July 2000.

Coach
In 2004, he became the manager of Levski, most notably leading the team to the UEFA Cup 2005-06 quarter final stage and then becoming the first Bulgarian club to ever reach the group stage of the UEFA Champions League during the 2006–07 season. He has also led the team to winning the national cup in 2005 and 2007, Bulgarian Supercup in 2005 and 2007 and the 2005/2006 and 2006/2007 national championship.

Stoilov briefly coached the Bulgarian national under-19 side (2003–2004). In April 2007, Stanimir Stoilov was assigned as caretaker manager of the Bulgarian national football team for the matches against Belarus in June from the Euro 2008 qualification campaign. His side won the first match against Belarus in Minsk 2–0 on 2 June 2007 and the second in Sofia 2–1 on 6 June 2007.

On 7 May 2008, Stoilov was sacked from Levski Sofia together with his friend and colleague Nasko Sirakov. Before the 2008–09 season he took over at Litex Lovech. He led them to winning the Bulgarian cup in 2009, but quit after the club failed to reach the group stage of the Europa League.

In the beginning of 2009, Stanimir was announced as the manager of Bulgaria.

Bulgaria under Stoilov did not qualify for the World Cup. After two draws with the main rival for the play-offs Ireland and a 2–0 victory against Cyprus Bulgaria's job became even harder. During the summer and autumn of 2009 Bulgaria won against Latvia 1–0 in a friendly and against Montenegro with 4–1, but then Stoilov suffered his first loss with the national team against Italy with 2–0. From that moment on everything for Stoilov stopped going according to plan and he recorded a disappointing loss from Cyprus with 4–1. Bulgaria finished the campaign with a 6–2 win against Georgia. The draw for the UEFA Euro 2012 resulted in Bulgaria finding itself in a qualifying group with England, Switzerland, Wales and Montenegro.

2010 was a very disappointing year for Stoilov and Bulgaria. He recorded a series of weak results, including 5 losses and only 1 draw with South Africa in 6 games. On 7 September 2010, Bulgaria lost for the first time in 5 years in Sofia from Montenegro in a UEFA Euro 2012 qualifier with a score of 0–1. After this match Stoilov announced his resignation from his position as coach of the national team.

In 2011 he was coaching Anorthosis Famagusta, where he banned two players, Mark Fotheringham and Giannis Skopelitis, to train at the club's training ground.

In the winter of 2012 Stoilov was appointed as the new manager of Botev Plovdiv. His official debut was on 1 March 2013 against Slavia Sofia in a 2:2 draw. In the 2013–14 UEFA Europa League, Botev eliminated 2 teams, before losing to Stuttgart on away goals. On a domestic level, Botev became only 2014 cup runner-up.

On 22 June 2014, Stoilov signed with FC Astana of the Kazakhstan Premier League. In the 2014–15 UEFA Europa League, Astana eliminated three teams to reach the play-offs, where they lost to Villarreal. The club won its maiden title in the 2014 season, despite being in third place when Stoilov had become its manager. Astana was entitled to play in the second qualifying round of the 2015–16 UEFA Champions League, where Stoilov's team eliminated NK Maribor. Astana beat HJK Helsinki in the third qualifying round and APOEL Nicosia in the play-off round. Thus, Stanimir Stoilov became the first Bulgarian to coach two teams in the group stage of the Champions League. On 9 December 2015, Stoilov extended his Astana contract for another two years. On 8 January 2018, Astana announced they had agreed a new contract with Stoilov.

On 1 September 2021, Stoilov took over the team of Levski Sofia for the second time in his career. He was appointed as a manager in one of the worst moments in the club's history, ranking 10th in the league standings after the first 6 games with 4 losses and just 2 wins and in a very bad financial state. A few days after his appointment he released three players – Simeon Slavchev, Valeri Bojinov and Hristofor Hubchev and signed two younger – José Córdoba from Etar and Dimitar Kostadinov from Septemvri Sofia. Under his management, the team managed to improve promptly, earning 20 points by the end of the half-season with 5 wins, 5 draws, and 3 losses and qualifying for the Bulgarian Cup quarter-finals, eliminating Marek Dupnitsa and Septemvri Simitli. The better results of the team were completely justified as Stoilov managed to dramatically improve the team's style of play, with Levski dominating in most of the games. Thus, at the time of the winter break, the team had climbed to 6th place in the league standings. In the upcoming transfer window, Stoilov released 6 players – Gjoko Zajkov, Christos Shelis, Ivaylo Naydenov, Borislav Tsonev, Georgi Aleksandrov and Martin Petkov, and signed just as many – defenders Kellian van der Kaap and Noah Sonko Sundberg, Bulgarians Iliyan Stefanov from Beroe and Filip Krastev (on loan from Belgian Lommel), both attacking midfielders. The other new additions were Brazilians Wenderson Tsunami (a left-back) and Welton (a forward). All of the newcomers became a key part of Stoilov's squad and were relatively young (all of them signed as free agents except Welton). In the second half of the season the team showed tremendous improvement winning 11 league games, drawing 2 and losing 2 finishing 4th in the final standings. In addition, Stoilov's Levski won the Cup, securing the first trophy for the team since 2009 and participation in European tournaments. In the quarter-finals, the team eliminated Septemvri Sofia with a 2–0 home win, and then faced Ludogorets in the semis, knocking them out with 4–2 aggregate score. The Cup final was against Levski's biggest rival – CSKA Sofia. Stoilov's team won 1–0, with the only goal scored by Iliyan Stefanov from long range. Throughout the whole tournament, Stoilov gave chance to the reserve goalkeeper of Levski – born in 2004 – Plamen Andreev, who started in each of the six matches, conceding only 2 goals (both in the first leg game against Ludogorets).

Coaching philosophy
Stoilov's teams tend to emphasize possession football and good ball control and he has been praised for his openness to promoting young players from the junior squads to the senior team. He also played a part in reinvigorating the career of Hristo Yovov, who subsequently established himself as one of the key players for Levski Sofia in the mid-2000s.

Career statistics

Club

International

International statistics

International goals

Manager

Honours

Player
Levski Sofia
 Bulgarian League (4): 1994–95, 1999–2000, 2000–01, 2001–02
 Bulgarian Cup (5): 1990–91, 1991–92, 1999–2000, 2001–02, 2002–03

Individual
 Vtora Liga Top Goalscorer (1): 1989–90

Manager
Levski Sofia
 Bulgarian League (2): 2005–06, 2006–07
 Bulgarian Cup (3): 2004–05, 2006–07, 2021–22
 Bulgarian Supercup (2): 2005, 2007
Litex Lovech
 Bulgarian Cup (1): 2008–09
Astana
 Kazakhstan Premier League (4): 2014, 2015, 2016, 2017
 Kazakhstan Cup (1): 2016
 Kazakhstan Super Cup (1): 2015

Individual
Football manager of the year in Bulgaria (2): 2017, 2022

International competitions
UEFA Cup: 
Quarter-finalist (1): 2005–06 with Levski

UEFA Champions League
Group Stage (2): 2006–07 with Levski, 2015–16 with Astana
UEFA Europa League
 Group Stage 2016–17 with Astana

References

External links
Profile at foradejogo.net
Profile at national-football-teams.com

1967 births
Living people
FC Astana managers
Bulgarian footballers
Bulgaria international footballers
FC Haskovo players
PFC Levski Sofia players
Fenerbahçe S.K. footballers
PFC CSKA Sofia players
PFC Slavia Sofia players
S.C. Campomaiorense players
First Professional Football League (Bulgaria) players
Second Professional Football League (Bulgaria) players
Süper Lig players
Bulgarian expatriate footballers
Expatriate footballers in Turkey
Bulgarian expatriate sportspeople in Turkey
Expatriate footballers in Portugal
Bulgarian expatriate sportspeople in Portugal
Bulgarian football managers
PFC Levski Sofia managers
PFC Litex Lovech managers
Bulgaria national football team managers
Bulgarian expatriate football managers
People from Haskovo
Bulgarian expatriate sportspeople in Kazakhstan
Botev Plovdiv managers
Expatriate football managers in Kazakhstan
Association football midfielders
Kazakhstan national football team managers
Anorthosis Famagusta F.C. managers
Sportspeople from Haskovo Province